The 2022–23 season is the club's third season in Indian Super League. Due to lengthened schedule of 2022 AFC Cup, the knockout stage is moved to 2022–23 season from 2021–22 season as it is to be played in September 2022.

Summary

August
ATK Mohun Bagan announced their 27-man squad for the Durand Cup campaign, which included all the 6 foreigners, on 19 August.

The team officially began the season on 20 August with a 2–3 loss against Rajasthan United in the Durand Cup.

The first win of the season came on 28 August, where they defeated their city rivals East Bengal in a Kolkata Derby by 0–1, courtesy to an own goal.

September
After Rajasthan United won against Indian Navy in the group runner-up decider, ATK Mohun Bagan slipped to the third spot on the basis of head-to-head points with Rajasthan United and failed to qualify for the knockouts.

ATK Mohun Bagan got knocked out from 2022 AFC Cup after 1–3 loss against Kuala Lumpur City at home in the inter-zonal semi-final.

Ashutosh Mehta was handed a suspension for 2 years by Anti-Doping Disciplinary Panel (ADDP) for failing a dope test performed last season on 8 February.

The management decided to opt out of 2022 Calcutta Premier Division A since there was no reserve squad to field a team and cited that FSDL doesn't allow registered players to play any other tournament during the ISL window.

October 
On 10 October ATK Mohun Bagan's ISL campaign commenced with a shocking home defeat against Chennaiyin after losing their half-time lead with the turn of an hour in the match.

A dominating away victory against Kerala Blasters recorded the club's 25th win in ISL, as Dimitri Petratos deservingly earned the Hero of the Match award with a hattrick and an assist.

Squad

First-team squad

Other players under contract

Reserve squad

Transfers

In

Promotion from B team

Out

Pre-season

Competitions

Overview

Durand Cup

Group stage

Group table

Matches

2022 AFC Cup

Knockout stage

Match

Indian Super League

League table

Result summary

Results by round

Matches

ISL Playoffs

Knockout

Semifinals

Final

Super Cup

Group stage

Group C

Indian Additional Club Qualifiers For AFC Cup

Statistics 

All stats are correct as of 18 March 2023

All Competition

Hat-tricks

Youth team

Reliance Foundation Development League

Regional qualifiers East region 
</onlyinclude>

Stats

Hat-tricks

Notes

References

ATK Mohun Bagan FC seasons
2022–23 Indian Super League season by team